Agave salmiana (also known as maguey pulquero and  green maguey) is a species of the family Asparagaceae, native to central and southern Mexico. It is also reportedly naturalized in South Africa, Italy and Spain, specially in the Canary Islands.

This species, also called Agave of Salm or Salm-Dick, is dedicated to the German prince and botanist Joseph zu Salm-Reifferscheidt-Dyck (1773-1861).

Description 

A. salmiana  presents a spiral-shaped rosette with large flared and erect leaves. These leaves are thick, dark green with a large point at the tip and strong spines on the edges. When a leaf has unfolded, it leaves an imprint on the leaf underneath.

Like most agaves, the species is monocarpic, that is to say it only flowers once and then dies. The largest specimens have been significantly taller.

Old plants reach 1.8 m in height and the leaves form a rosette 3.6 m in diameter.

The variety A. salmiana var. ferox (K.Koch) Gentry is often encountered in cultivation. The epithet ferox is due to the hard and long (up to 8 cm) spines.

Distribution 
Originally from southern and central Mexico, it was introduced into gardens with a Mediterranean climate in Europe and sometimes escaped into the wild, thus becoming naturalised in some parts of southern Europe.

Cultivation 
Cultivation is easy in a well-drained sandy soil with sunny exposure. For a pot culture, it requires a container of very large size to remain in a harmonious appearance. It can be used to stabilise a slope. It can withstand a light frost if it is completely dry. It is multiplied more easily by planting shoots than by seedlings.

References

External links

salmiana
Flora of Mexico
Plants described in 1859